H&L Records (1976–1979) was a record label founded by Hugo Peretti and Luigi Creatore after they left Avco Records. They took The Stylistics with them.

See also
 List of record labels

Notes

American record labels
Soul music record labels